The Kiss of Death (Italian: Il Bacio della Morte) is a black and white photograph by an unknown author, taken on 12 May 1957. It depicts the moment in which Linda Christian kisses Alfonso de Portago at a brief stop during the 1957 Mille Miglia race in northern Italy. Portago was killed moments later when a tire burst at 150m/h in Guidizzolo, Cavriana. Over the years, it has become one of the most renowned photographs of kisses and a symbol of young audacity and passion.

The photograph depicts actress Linda Christian (wearing a dotted dress and headscarf), leaning in for a short kiss with Formula 1 driver Alfonso de Portago who wears the typical 1950's racing gear; a white helmet, goggles and a leather jacket. A crowd of onlookers joyfully stares, while journalists immortalise the scene with their cameras. The photograph became famous in Italy and was popularly named "Il Bacio della Morte" (The Kiss of Death) in reference to Portago's death shortly after the image was taken. The image was published in newspapers in the days following the race. Life magazine gave fame to the photograph after it published it in its May 27 issue, under the title "Death finally takes a man who courted it".

In later interviews, Linda Christian remembered the moment almost like a premonition: 

The image is part of the Bettmann Archive, stored in the Iron Mountain National Underground Storage Facility, a former limestone quarry located 220 feet (67 m) below ground in western Pennsylvania.

See also
Il bacio

References

1957 works
1957 in art
Black-and-white photographs
Photography in Italy
1950s photographs